Jill Ciment (born March 19, 1953) is an American writer.

Biography
Ciment was born in Montreal, Quebec, Canada.  She studied art at the California Institute of Arts (CalArts), under John Baldessari. She earned her BFA from CalArts in 1975. She received her MFA in creative writing from the University of California, Irvine in 1981.

Ciment is a professor of English at the University of Florida in Gainesville, Florida. Her novel, Heroic Measures was one of titles chosen by Oprah Winfrey's Book Club for 2009 summer reading. This book was also one of the top five finalists for the Los Angeles Times Book Award for 2010.
5 Flights Up, a film adaptation of Heroic Measures starring Morgan Freeman and Diane Keaton, was released in the U.S. on May 8, 2015.

She married artist Arnold Mesches when she was 17 and they were married until his death in 2016. Her memoir, Half a Life, reflected on their relationship, and following his death and in context of the Me Too movement she is re-examining this work in a new memoir, The Other Half.

Grants and literary awards
Two New York State Foundation for the Arts Fellowship (1996 and 2002)
National Endowment for the Arts Fellowship (2005)
Guggenheim Foundation grant (2006)
The Janet Heidinger Kafka Prize (2005)
NEA Japan Fellowship Prize

Works

Novels 

The Law of Falling Bodies, Poseidon, 1993
Teeth of the Dog, Crown, 1998
The Tattoo Artist, Pantheon, 2005
Heroic Measures, Pantheon, 2009
Act of God, Pantheon, 2015
The Hand That Feeds You, (with Amy Hempel) writing as A.J. Rich, Scribner, 2015
The Body in Question, Pantheon, 2019

Short stories 

Collections:
Small Claims, Weidenfeld & Nicolson, 1986, collection of 4 (or more) short stories:
 "Self-Portrait with Vanishing Point", "Genetics", "Astronomy", "Money" (novella)

Non-fiction 

Half a Life, Crown, 1996 (memoir)

Adaptations 

 Astronomy (1998), short directed by Susan Rogers, based on short story "Astronomy"
 5 Flights Up (2014), film directed by Richard Loncraine, based on novel Heroic Measures

References

External links

 

1955 births
Living people
University of Florida faculty
Writers from Montreal
California Institute of the Arts alumni
University of California, Irvine alumni
National Endowment for the Arts Fellows